Wild hyacinth may refer to:
Hyacinthoides non-scripta, a European species also called the common bluebell
Camassia, a genus of six North American species
Dipterostemon capitatus, a species from North America, the only species in the genus Dipterostemon
Dichelostemma multiflorum, a species from California and Oregon
Lachenalia contaminata, a species from South Africa
various species of Brodiaea, from western North America